Bernard Newman may refer to:

 Bernard Newman (politician) (1914–1995), Canadian politician
 Bernard Newman (author) (1897–1968), British author
 Bernard Newman (judge) (1907/08–1999), Judge on the United States Court of International Trade
 Bernard Newman (designer) (1903–1966), American fashion designer for Bergdorf Goodman and RKO Pictures